Eckartshausen-Ilshofen station is a railway station in the Eckartshausen district of the municipality of Ilshofen, located in the Schwäbisch Hall district in Baden-Württemberg, Germany.

References

Railway stations in Baden-Württemberg
Buildings and structures in Schwäbisch Hall (district)